Beginning with three synods convened between 264 and 269 in the matter of Paul of Samosata, more than thirty councils were held in Antioch in ancient times.  Most of these dealt with phases of the Arian and of the Christological controversies. For example, the Catholic Encyclopedia article on Paul of Samosata states:

The most celebrated convened in the summer of 341 at the dedication of the Domus Aurea, and is therefore called  or dedication council. Nearly a hundred Eastern bishops were present, but the bishop of Rome was not represented. The emperor Constantius II attended in person.

The Synods of Antioch in 264-269

The Synod of Antioch in 341 

The council approved three creeds. Whether or not the so-called "fourth formula" is to be ascribed to a continuation of this synod or to a subsequent but distinct assembly of the same year, its aim is like that of the first three; while repudiating certain Arian formulas it avoids the orthodox term homoousios, fiercely advocated by Athanasius of Alexandria and accepted by the First Council of Nicaea (Nicaea I). The somewhat colourless compromise doubtless proceeded from the party of Eusebius of Nicomedia, and proved not unacceptable to the more nearly orthodox members of the synod.

The twenty-five canons adopted regulate the so-called metropolitan constitution of the church. Ecclesiastical power is vested chiefly in the metropolitan (later called archbishop), and the biannual provincial synod (see Nicaea I, canon 5.), which he summons and over which he presides. Consequently, the powers of country bishops (chorepiscopi) are curtailed, and direct recourse to the emperor is forbidden. The sentence of one judicatory is to be respected by other judicatories of equal rank; re-trial may take place only before that authority to whom appeal regularly lies. Without due invitation, a bishop may not ordain, or in any other way interfere with affairs lying outside his proper territory; nor may he appoint his own successor.  Penalties are set on the refusal to celebrate Easter in accordance with the Nicaea I decree, as well as on leaving a church before the service of the Eucharist is completed.

The numerous objections made by scholars in past centuries about the canons ascribed to this council have been elaborately stated and probably refuted by Hefele. The canons formed part of the Codex canonum used at Chalcedon in 451 and are found in later Eastern and Western collections of canons.

See also 
 SS Pelagia & Nonnus, two legendary Syrian saints who supposedly met during one of the synods at Antioch
 Ancient church councils (pre-ecumenical)

Notes
The canons of the Synod in 341 are printed in Greek, and translated. The four dogmatic formulas are given by G. Ludwig Hahn.

References

Citations

Sources 

 

3rd-century church councils
4th-century church councils
Ancient Christian controversies
260s
260s in the Roman Empire
341
340s in the Byzantine Empire
Synods